Kowsar Tehran  was an Iranian football club based in Tehran, Iran. They competed in the Azadegan League.

Football clubs in Tehran